Larry Flanagan (born Scotland 1955) is a Scottish trade union leader and former politician.

Flanagan attended the University of Stirling before becoming a teacher at Blantyre High School.  He also became active in the Militant Tendency and in the Labour Party.  He was elected to Glasgow City Council, where he called for the party to oppose the Poll Tax with a campaign of non-payment.  He hoped to stand in the 1988 Glasgow Govan by-election, but was not considered as a candidate due to his involvement with Militant.

Early in the 1990s, Flanagan was suspended from the Labour group on the council due to disagreements about strategy with relation to the Poll Tax.  He instead focused on his teaching career, at Penilee High School in Paisley and then Hillhead High School in Glasgow.  He also became increasingly prominent in the Educational Institute of Scotland (EIS) trade union, being elected to its council and convening its education committee.  In 2012, he was elected as the union's general secretary.  He also represents the union on the General Council of the Trades Union Congress, and the General Council of the Scottish Trades Union Congress.

References

1950s births
Living people
Councillors in Glasgow
General secretaries of British trade unions
Labour Party (UK) councillors
Members of the General Council of the Trades Union Congress
Militant tendency supporters
Scottish trade unionists